Eupoecilia kobeana is a species of moth of the family Tortricidae. It is found in China (Guangxi, Guizhou, Henan, Hunan, Yunnan), Taiwan, Japan, Korea and Russia.

The wingspan is 8.5–10.5 mm.

References

Moths described in 1968
Eupoecilia